Georgia State Route 148 can refer to:

 Georgia State Route 148 (1939–1949): A former state highway that existed from Fort Oglethorpe to Ringgold; replaced by State Route 2
 Georgia State Route 148 (1955–1966): A former state highway that existed northwest of Macon; replaced by Interstate 75

148